Kolar is a city in Karnataka, India.

Kolar may also refer to:

Geography

India
Kolar district, in Karnataka, India
Kolar (Lok Sabha constituency), in Karnataka, India
Kolar Dam, in Maharashtra, India
Kolar Gold Fields, in Karnataka, India
Kolar Plateau, in Karnataka, India
Kolar River (Madhya Pradesh), in Madhya Pradesh, India
Kolar River (Maharashtra), in Maharashtra, India

Iran
Kolar, Bushehr, a village in Bushehr Province, Iran
Kolar, Razavi Khorasan, a village in Razavi Khorasan Province, Iran

Names
Kolar (surname)
Kolář, a Czech surname and people so named
Kolár

See also
 
Kallar (disambiguation)